Rodney Mobiha (born 1 February 1994) is a Papua New Guinean footballer who plays as a midfielder for Birkenhead United and the Papua New Guinea national football team. He made his debut for the national team on 12 October 2014 in a 5–0 loss against the Philippines.

Club career
Mobiha started his career with the development team of the Papua New Guinea Football Association called: Besta United PNG. In 2013, he moved to Admiralty Palaiau where he made it to become a member of the national team. In 2016, he moved to New Zealand side Birkenhead United.

International career
Mobiha played for PNG U17 during the 2011 OFC U-17 Championship and PNG U23 during the 2015 Pacific Games on home soil where they made it to a bronze medal. He didn't play for the U20's during the 2013 OFC U-20 Championship because of an injury. He made his debut for the national team on 12 October 2014. After this match it took more than two years to be called up again, on 30 October 2016 for a friendly match against Malaysia.

References

1994 births
Living people
Papua New Guinean footballers
Association football midfielders
Papua New Guinean expatriate footballers
Papua New Guinea international footballers
Papua New Guinean expatriate sportspeople in New Zealand
Birkenhead United AFC players